Erica Alfridi (born 22 February 1968) is a former Italian race walker, who has won an individual senior level World Race Walking Cup.

Biography
Erica Alfridi won three medals, at individual level, at the International athletics competitions. She participated at one edition of the Summer Olympics (2000), she has 29 caps in sixteen years in national team from 1988 to 2004.

Progression
She finished the season 10 times in world top 20, in 1997 she was World Leader in the 10 km walk.

10 km walk

20 km walk

Achievements

National titles
She won 11 times the individual national championship.
2 wins in the 5000 walk track (1998, 2002)
2 wins in the 10 km walk (1988, 1997)
3 wins in the 20 km walk (1996, 1997, 1999)
4 wins in the 3000 metres walk indoor (1996, 1997, 1999, 2000)

See also
 Italy at the World Athletics Race Walking Team Championships - Multiple medalists
 Italy at the European Race Walking Cup - Multiple medalists
 Italian all-time lists - 20 km walk

References

External links
 
 Erica Alfridi at La marcia nel mondo 

1968 births
Living people
Sportspeople from the Province of Verona
Italian female racewalkers
Athletes (track and field) at the 2000 Summer Olympics
Olympic athletes of Italy
European Athletics Championships medalists
World Athletics Championships athletes for Italy
Mediterranean Games gold medalists for Italy
Mediterranean Games medalists in athletics
Athletes (track and field) at the 2001 Mediterranean Games
World Athletics Race Walking Team Championships winners